Carl Sture Mikael Andersson (born November 18, 1949) is an ice hockey player who played for the Swedish national team. He won a bronze medal at the 1980 Winter Olympics.

References 

1949 births
Living people
Ice hockey players at the 1980 Winter Olympics
Modo Hockey players
Olympic ice hockey players of Sweden
Olympic bronze medalists for Sweden
Olympic medalists in ice hockey
Medalists at the 1980 Winter Olympics